Kosut (also Romanized as Kosūt) is a village in Garmab Rural District, Chahardangeh District, Sari County, Mazandaran Province, Iran. At the 2006 census, its population was 117, in 33 families.

References 

Populated places in Sari County